Alyssa Conley (born 27 April 1991) is a South African athlete competing in sprinting events. She won the silver medal in the 200 metres at the 2016 African Championships.

International competitions

Personal bests
Outdoor
100 metres – 11.23 (+0.6 m/s, Gavardo 2016)
200 metres – 22.84 (+1.2 m/s, Durban 2016)

References

1991 births
Living people
South African female sprinters
Sportspeople from Johannesburg
Athletes (track and field) at the 2016 Summer Olympics
Olympic athletes of South Africa
Olympic female sprinters
20th-century South African women
21st-century South African women